Gul Sanobar is an Indian fantasy adventure television series created by Dhirubhai Gohil which aired on DD national from 1999 to 2000. It is based on the Persian legend of Gul o Sanaubar and the Arabian Nights.

Cast

Asif Sheikh as Shehzada Tamaas of Hindustan
Seema Kapoor as Mehrangez
Parikshit Sahni as Sultan of Hindustan
Ranjeet as Veer Singh the commander of Hindustan
Vindu Dara Singh as Turki
Saeed Jaffery as Sultan of Iran
Pradeep Rawat
Vinod Kapoor
Nimay Bali as Jhigala
Deep Dhilon as Zargam
Shiva as Ziyaak
Arjun (Firoz Khan) as Almaas
Mamik Singh as Changez
Sheeba Akashdeep as Zeenat

Episodes
Source:
 The return of Prince Taimas
 Execution of Kabul Prince
 Escaped prisoners
 The arrogant queen
 Unsolved mystery of Gul Sanobar
 The torture of queen Mehrangez
 Search for absconding prisoners
 Declare of war on Turkistan
 The beginning of war
 Capture of Zighala
 The evil blood
 The mystery of stone statue
 Death of Veer Singh

Home media
RDG Productions Pvt. Ltd. re-released the show on its YouTube channel starting from 2018.

References

External links

Indian period television series
Doordarshan original programming
Works based on One Thousand and One Nights
DD National original programming
Television shows based on fairy tales